Donna Bailey is an American politician and attorney from Maine. A Democrat, she serves in the Maine Senate representing District 31, which includes her residence in  Saco, as well as the towns of Old Orchard Beach, Hollis, Limington and part of Buxton. Bailey grew up in Berlin, New Hampshire, and attended Berlin High School, Bates College and the University of Maine School of Law. She worked in real estate law, family law and probate law in private practice and was first elected to the Maine House of Representatives in 2016. In 2020, Bailey was elected to her first term in the Maine Senate.

Early life and education
Bailey was born in 1961 and grew up in Berlin, New Hampshire. Her mother and grandfather worked in mills and factories, and Bailey was one of the first Head Start students as a young child. She began working at age 14 and graduated from Berlin High School in 1979, continuing to Bates College where she earned a degree in European history in 1979.

Bailey credits a maternal great aunt, Hilda Brungot, with inspiring her to pursue a law career. Brungot was the longest-serving woman state representative in the New Hampshire General Court. Bailey attended the University of Maine School of Law and completed her J.D. in 1986.

Beginning her legal career in real estate law, Bailey worked for the Maine Title Company for four years before opening a private practice in 1991. She continued in private civil practice, including real estate, family and probate law. She served as the York County Judge of Probate for four years.

Political career
Bailey first ran for the Maine House District 31 in 2016. She was unopposed in the primary and won the three-way general election with 50% of the vote. She was again unopposed in the 2018 House District 31 Democratic primary and won the three-way general election with 57% of the vote. While serving in the House, Bailey was the House Chair of the Judiciary Committee, the House Chair of the Maine Indian Claims Task Force, an appointee to the Pre-Trial Justice Task Force, and chair of the subcommittee to re-write the Maine probate code.

In 2018, Bailey ran again for House District 31 and was unopposed in the Democratic primary. In August 2020, Maine Senate District 14 incumbent Justin Chenette dropped out of the race and Bailey announced that she would instead run for the Senate seat. She announced her Senate candidacy on August 12, 2020, and defeated Republican Craig Pendleton 55%-45% in the November general election. Bailey serves on the Appropriations and Financial Affairs & Government Oversight committees.

Personal life
Bailey and her husband, Joseph Parrette, live in Saco. They have two sons and two grandchildren. Bailey spends her spare time reading, researching genealogy, kayaking, hiking, gardening and spending time with family.

Electoral history

Maine House

Maine Senate

References

Notes

External links
Official website: Senator Donna Bailey
Senator Donna Bailey on Facebook
Maine Senate Democrats: Senate District 31 Donna Bailey
During Pandemic, Our Community Steps Up To Keep Neighbors Fed by Donna Bailey & Lori Gramlich

1961 births
Living people
People from Berlin, New Hampshire
American lawyers
Bates College alumni
University of Maine School of Law alumni
Democratic Party Maine state senators
Women state legislators in Maine
21st-century American women politicians
21st-century American politicians
Maine lawyers
People from Saco, Maine
Democratic Party members of the Maine House of Representatives